Greg Houla (born 19 July 1988) is a French professional footballer. He plays as an attacking midfielder or a striker for Thai League 2 club Chainat Hornbill.

Honour
Nongbua Pitchaya
 Thai League 2 Champions : 2020–21

References

External links
 
 

Greg Houla profile at foot-national.com

1988 births
Living people
Sportspeople from Amiens
French footballers
French expatriate footballers
Association football midfielders
En Avant Guingamp players
Rapid de Menton players
Stade Briochin players
La Vitréenne FC players
Luçon FC players
Chamois Niortais F.C. players
Ergotelis F.C. players
US Orléans players
Ligue 2 players
Greg Houla
Greg Houla
Greg Houla
Greg Houla
Greg Houla
Super League Greece players
Expatriate footballers in Greece
Expatriate footballers in Thailand
Footballers from Hauts-de-France
French expatriate sportspeople in Greece
French expatriate sportspeople in Thailand